Troups Creek is a tributary of the Cowanesque River in Steuben County, New York and Tioga County, Pennsylvania, in the United States. It is possible to canoe on portions of the creek at times.

Course
Troups Creek begins in northern Troupsburg, Steuben County, New York. It flows southeast for several miles before turning east for some distance. The creek then turns south and begins flowing parallel to New York State Route 36. After several miles, it passes Young Hickory Hollow and Squab Hollow and turns south-southeast and then southeast. Several miles further downstream, the creek exits Troupsburg and Steuben County.

Upon exiting Steuben County, New York, Troups Creek enters Brookfield Township, Tioga County, Pennsylvania. In this township, the creek almost immediately receives the tributary North Brook and begins flowing parallel to Pennsylvania Route 249. A short distance further downstream, it picks up the tributaries South Brook Troups Creek and Biscuit Hollow. The creek then enters Deerfield Township, Tioga County and continues southeast, receiving the tributaries Christie Run and Crotch Run. Some distance later, the creek turns south and enters the community of Knoxville. In Knoxville, it crosses Pennsylvania Route 49 and reaches its confluence with the Cowanesque River.

Geography

The valley of Troups Creek is narrow and contains pastures. Floodplains inhabited by sycamore trees are also found on some areas of the creek. The creek has low banks, which have riprap on them in places. There are thick deposits of cobbles, gravel bars, and rock gardens on it. However, the creek has only a few strainers.

Troups Creek has a gauging station on Pennsylvania Route 49.

Recreation
The difficulty rating of the creek is 2. Edward Gertler describes the scenery along it as "good" in his book Keystone Canoeing.

See also
List of rivers of New York
List of rivers of Pennsylvania

References

Rivers of New York (state)
Rivers of Pennsylvania
Rivers of Tioga County, Pennsylvania
Tributaries of the Chemung River
Rivers of Steuben County, New York